A pusher trailer is a device attached to the rear of a vehicle or bike that provides force to assist the vehicle.

For bikes

Electric
Electric pusher trailers use energy stored in a battery, typically of lithium ion or sealed lead acid chemistry, to provide power.  Two wheel and one wheel designs are common.

Gas 
Gas powered pusher trailers typically employ a two or four stroke internal combustion engine to provide power.

For cars
Pusher trailers are gasoline, diesel or electric fueled trailers with a traditional internal combustion engine (petroleum engines) and transmission which can be hitched up to battery electric vehicles and run from the cockpit to give the vehicle increased range.

The trailer provides ground traction through the wheels to push the trailer forward, and by default, the electric vehicle as well. In this way, a trip beyond the normal range of the EV can be undertaken without stopping for recharging.

Some types of articulated bus have the engine (and propulsion) in the rear section.

See also
Bicycle trailer
Genset trailer
 Trailer (vehicle)

References

External links
 http://www.evalbum.com/pushers.html
 https://web.archive.org/web/20010203125300/http://jstraubel.com/EVpusher/EVpusher.htm
 http://www.eugeneweb.com/~sharkey/pusher.htm

Electric vehicles